Hunloke is a surname. Notable people with the surname include:

Edward Hunloke
Henry Hunloke (1906–1978), British politician
Philip Hunloke (1868–1947), British sailor and courtier
Hunloke Baronets